Dharampal Gulati (27 March 1923 – 3 December 2020), also known as Mahashay Dharampal Gulati, was an Indian businessman, and founder and CEO of MDH (Mahashian Di Hatti), an Indian spice company. He was referred to as 'spice-king' in reference to his pioneering of ready-to-use ground spices. He was awarded the Padma Bhushan, India's third highest civilian award, in 2019.

Early life 
Gulati was born on 27 March 1923 in Sialkot in present-day Pakistan. His father, Chunnilal Gulati, had a spice shop in the town named Mahashian Di Hatti, which was also known by the name Deggi Mirch Wale. In 1933, at the age of 10, he dropped out of school and worked assorted jobs including carpentry, rice trading, and selling hardware, before joining in to help his father in his spice business.

Joining his father's spice shop in Sialkot, Gulati helped expand the store to Lahore, Shekhupura, Nankana Sahib, Lyallpur, and Multan  in Punjab.

However, in 1947, with the partition of India, the family was forced to leave Sialkot and make the journey across to what would be present day India. The family spent time in a refugee camp in Amritsar before making it across to New Delhi, to join his sister. Finding other tangawallas uncouth, and with little monetary reward, he opened a small stall to sell cane sugar which he shut down due to no prospects.

Career 
In 1958, he set up a small wooden pop-up store in the Karol Bagh region of New Delhi to restart his father's spice store and restored it with the same name, Mahashian Di Hatti. He advertised in the popular Hindi newspaper, Pratap, increasing the store's popularity. He set up his second store in Chandni Chowk, again in New Delhi, before buying land and setting up a manufacturing facility in the Kirti Nagar area of New Delhi in 1959. During this time, when most Indians would grind spices at home, he pioneered the concept of ready-to-use ground spices. The company was registered as MDH (an abbreviation of Mahashian Di Hatti) in 1965.

During this period, he was also noted for pioneering entrepreneurial brand marketing in India, with him serving as "Brand mascot, brand icon and brand ambassador". His image with ethnic wear of a turban, hook moustache, glasses and pearl necklace was printed on all of his company's spice packages as well as on advertising messages, making him one of the most endearing and likeable brand ambassadors in the country, according to brand consultants.

Positions 
 Managing director – Super Delicacies Private Limited
 Director – Mahashian Di Hatti Private Limited
 Chairman – Mata Chanan Devi Hospital, New Delhi

Personal life and death 
Gulati founded 20 schools for furthering primary and secondary education, including the MDH International School, Mahashay Chunnilal Saraswati Shishu Mandir, Mata Lilawati Kanya Vidyalaya and Mahashay Dharampal Vidya Mandir. He set up a 200-bed hospital for the poor in New Delhi and a mobile hospital for slum dwellers. His charity foundation, with his father's name, Mahashay Chunnilal Charitable Trust, administers some of his charity initiatives. During the COVID-19 pandemic, he gave money to the Chief Minister's relief fund and donated 7,500 PPE kits to healthcare workers in the union territory of Delhi.

Gulati was awarded with Padma Bhushan, India's third highest civilian honour, in 2019.

Gulati died on 3 December 2020, at the Mata Chanan Devi Hospital in Delhi of cardiac arrest due to post COVID-19 complications. He had been admitted in the hospital in November. He was aged 97.

Notes

References 

2001 births
People from Sialkot
20th-century Indian businesspeople
21st-century Indian businesspeople
Indian chief executives
Businesspeople in the food industry
Recipients of the Padma Bhushan in trade and industry
2020 deaths
Deaths from the COVID-19 pandemic in India